George Druce may refer to:

 George Claridge Druce (1850–1932), English botanist and mayor of Oxford
 George Druce (cricketer) (1821–1869), English barrister and cricketer